USS Baker may refer to more than one United States Navy ship:

 , a destroyer escort in commission from 1943 to 1946
 , the name of more than one ship
 , the name of more than one ship

United States Navy ship names